DVDXpress is a media company that owns and operates a network of DVD rental kiosks in supermarket locations across North America. The company, now the second largest player in the DVD kiosk sector after Redbox, was founded in 2001 by entrepreneurs Greg Meyer and Jason Tanzer as a way to fill the need for a more efficient and cost-effective method to provide DVD rentals in existing retail establishments. DVDXpress was acquired by Coinstar, Inc. in late 2007, subsequently merged with their Redbox division in 2009, and ultimately spun out as an independent entity.

Locations
DVDXpress has many of its domestic kiosks in Kroger, Bashas, Lowes, Albertsons, Haggen, Acme, The Markets, Safeway Inc., ShopRite and WinCo Foods supermarkets. DVDXpress kiosks offer DVD rentals at a price point between $1.50 and $2.00 per day.

Technology
The DVDXpress kiosks utilize RFID technology to identify the DVDs that it dispenses and wireless technology to communicate to the Internet. The DVDs are dispensed in their original studio cases from the kiosk. Customers have the ability to browse availability of titles real-time via the company's website and reserve movies to be picked up at the kiosk at a later time.

See also
Competitors include Redbox.

External links
DVDXpress US website
DVDXpress Adds Online Reservations
Bi-Lo Rolls Out RFID DVD Rental Kiosks

Video rental services
Retail companies established in 2001
Coinstar